The Midland Rail Heritage Trust was founded on 28 April 2004 by a group of railway enthusiasts to preserve and promote the Midland Railway line and the steam locomotives that worked it. It is based at the Old Railway Yards, Pococks Road, Springfield. The Trust is a member of the Federation of Rail Organisations of New Zealand. The Trust is also the owner and sole shareholder of the Midland Railway Company (NZ) Limited. As of 2021, Mainline Steam Heritage Trust's Christchurch depot was moved to here after the owner of the old depot in Middleton asked them to move on.

History
The Trust was formed in April 2004. It was incorporated under the Charitable Trusts Act 1957 on 27 May 2004.

In 2005 three locomotives that had been dumped in the Grey River at Omoto were recovered. They were Uc 369, Uc 370 and La 312. White Bus Family Production's had obtained the resource consent for the recovery and gave Uc369 and Uc370 to the Trust on the understanding that should the Trust fold then ownership would return to it. Ownership of La 312 was retained by White Bus Family Production.

Also in 2005 a pair of diesel shunters from the Islington Freezing works were donated to the Trust, and a 15 tonne gantry crane and equipment from the Otira Railway Workshop was acquired. In 2008 track was obtained from the old Burnham Army Camp siding. The lines from the old railway yard were connected to the Kiwirail network in January 2010. Through 2011 with the help of four workers from a Work and Income job scheme buildings were repaired and track work was undertaken.

The Trust's secretary in 2012 was Simon Walker. At that time the club made a submission to Parliament opposing the Gambling (Gambling Harm Reduction) Amendment Bill as they considered it would remove a source of funding from charitable gaming trusts that the club used.

Locomotives and rolling stock

Locomotives

 The MRHT has also in their care is the tender body from U 194.

Carriages

Wagons

References

External links
 MRHTs official website

Museums established in 2005

Heritage railways in New Zealand
2004 establishments in New Zealand